Fabien Valéri (born 9 June 1974) is a French professional football manager and former player who is the head coach of Championnat National 2 club Chambly.

Honours

Player 
Paris FC

 Championnat de France Amateur: 2005–06

Manager 
Paris 13 Atletico

 Championnat National 2: 2021–22

References

External links
 

1974 births
Living people
Association football midfielders
French footballers
French expatriate footballers
Expatriate footballers in Portugal
Ligue 2 players
Red Star F.C. players
Associação Naval 1º de Maio players
Associação Académica de Coimbra – O.A.F. players
AS Cannes players
FC Istres players
Paris FC players
ES Viry-Châtillon players
AS Choisy-le-Roi players
French football managers
UJA Maccabi Paris Métropole managers
Paris FC non-playing staff
Paris 13 Atletico managers
FC Chambly Oise managers
Championnat National 2 managers
Championnat National 3 managers
Championnat National players
Primeira Liga players
Championnat National 3 players
Championnat National 2 players